Pavel Igorevich Kudryashov (born 27 November 1996) is a Russian football player who plays as a right winger for Zvezda St. Petersburg.

Club career
Kudryashov made his professional debut in the Russian Professional Football League for FC Tom-2 Tomsk on 19 July 2014 in a game against FC Yakutiya Yakutsk.

Kudryashov made his Russian Premier League debut for FC Tom Tomsk on 7 August 2016 in a game against FC Lokomotiv Moscow.

On 18 October 2020, Kudryashov signed for Lori FC, leaving the club on 13 January 2021 after making 3 appearances for the club.

References

External links
 
 
 
 Profile at Crimean Football Union

1996 births
Sportspeople from Omsk
Living people
Russian footballers
Association football forwards
FC Tom Tomsk players
PFC Krylia Sovetov Samara players
FC Belshina Bobruisk players
FC Lori players
FC Krymteplytsia Molodizhne players
Russian Premier League players
Russian First League players
Russian Second League players
Armenian Premier League players
Belarusian Premier League players
Crimean Premier League players
Russian expatriate footballers
Expatriate footballers in Belarus
Expatriate footballers in Armenia